Akanksha Puri is an Indian actress and model, known for her work in Hindi TV shows, also few South Indian movies like Tamil, Malayalam and Kannada besides Bollywood movies. She is best known for her role as Goddess Parvati in Vighnaharta Ganesh.

Career
Puri made her Bollywood debut with Madhur Bhandarkar's 2015 drama film Calendar Girls. In 2017, she was cast as Mata AdiParashakti in Vighnaharta Ganesh.

Puri took up modelling projects during her short stint as an international cabin crew member. She was then spotted by a big production house in India's south, whence she bagged her first role in a Tamil movie.

She is the winner of the show Swayamvar – Mika Di Vohti.

Filmography

Films

Television

Music videos

References

External links

 
 
 

Living people
Indian film actresses
Actresses in Hindi cinema
Actresses in Tamil cinema
Actresses in Malayalam cinema
Actresses in Kannada cinema
21st-century Indian actresses
Female models from Madhya Pradesh
Actresses from Bhopal
Actresses in Hindi television
Year of birth missing (living people)